Chile Unido IF is a Swedish football club located in Norrköping.

Background
Chile Unido IF is a club with close roots to Chile.  The club currently plays in Division 4 Östergötland Östra which is the sixth tier of Swedish football. They play their home matches at the Sydvallen in Norrköping.

Chile Unido IF are affiliated to Östergötlands Fotbollförbund.

Season to season

Footnotes

External links
 Chile Unido IF – Official website
 Chile Unido IF on Facebook

Football clubs in Östergötland County
Association football clubs established in 1981
1981 establishments in Sweden